Nogometni klub Rakičan, commonly referred to as NK Rakičan or simply Rakičan, is a Slovenian football club which plays in the town of Rakičan. The club was established in 1950.

Honours
Slovenian Fourth Division
 Winners: 1994–95, 2000–01, 2010–11, 2018–19

League history since 1991

References

External links
Official website 

Association football clubs established in 1950
Football clubs in Slovenia
1950 establishments in Slovenia
Murska Sobota